Edwin Anthony Roberts (born 12 August 1941) is a retired Trinidadian runner. He competed at the 1964, 1968 and 1972 Olympics in various sprint events and had his best results in the 200 m, in which he finished third in 1964 and fourth in 1968. He also won a bronze medal in the 4 × 400 m relay in 1964.

Roberts attended North Carolina College in the United States between 1962 and 1966 where he was a member of the college track team. He was also part of the Trinidadian team that set a world record at 3:02.8 in the 4×440 yd relay at the 1966 Commonwealth Games. He was among world's top ten sprinters from 1964 to 1971, according to the votes of the experts of Track and Field News.

In 1969 Roberts was awarded the Trinidad & Tobago Humming Bird Medal Bronze. 
In 1984, he was inducted into the Alex M. Rivera Athletics Hall of Fame at North Carolina Central University.
In 1987, he was inducted into the Trinidad and Tobago Sports Hall of Fame.
In 2005, he was inducted into the Central American and Caribbean Athletic Confederation Hall of Fame.

References

1941 births
Living people
Trinidad and Tobago male sprinters
Athletes (track and field) at the 1964 Summer Olympics
Athletes (track and field) at the 1968 Summer Olympics
Athletes (track and field) at the 1972 Summer Olympics
Athletes (track and field) at the 1971 Pan American Games
Olympic athletes of Trinidad and Tobago
Olympic bronze medalists for Trinidad and Tobago
Commonwealth Games medallists in athletics
Athletes (track and field) at the 1962 British Empire and Commonwealth Games
Athletes (track and field) at the 1966 British Empire and Commonwealth Games
Athletes (track and field) at the 1970 British Commonwealth Games
Commonwealth Games gold medallists for Trinidad and Tobago
Commonwealth Games silver medallists for Trinidad and Tobago
Commonwealth Games bronze medallists for Trinidad and Tobago
Medalists at the 1964 Summer Olympics
Pan American Games bronze medalists for Trinidad and Tobago
Olympic bronze medalists in athletics (track and field)
Pan American Games medalists in athletics (track and field)
Central American and Caribbean Games gold medalists for Trinidad and Tobago
Central American and Caribbean Games silver medalists for Trinidad and Tobago
Central American and Caribbean Games bronze medalists for Trinidad and Tobago
Competitors at the 1962 Central American and Caribbean Games
Competitors at the 1966 Central American and Caribbean Games
Central American and Caribbean Games medalists in athletics
Medalists at the 1971 Pan American Games
Recipients of the Hummingbird Medal
Medallists at the 1966 British Empire and Commonwealth Games
Medallists at the 1970 British Commonwealth Games